The following is a list of events that have been called massacres that have occurred in New Zealand (numbers may be approximate). Massacres considered part of the campaigns of the New Zealand Wars are listed separately.

List

Massacres during the New Zealand Wars 

The following is a list of events that have been called massacres that occurred as part of the New Zealand Wars (numbers may be approximate):

References

New Zealand
Massacres

Massacres